On 26 April 2022, three people were killed in a school shooting at a kindergarten in Veshkayma, Ulyanovsk Oblast, Russia.

Shooting 
The attack occurred after 26-year old Ruslan Akhtyamov  entered the Ryabinka kindergarten with an IZh-27 double-barreled shotgun, shooting dead a staff member who tried to stop the attack. Walking into a classroom during the children's naptime, he opened fire, killing two small children, whom RIA Novosti said had been born in 2016 and 2018. Another staff member was wounded. After the shooting, Akhtyamov then turned the gun on himself and committed suicide.

The National Guard of Russia said that the firearm used by the perpetrator was obtained under the name of another person. Izvestia reported that the firearm's owner had been found dead, presumably killed by the kindergarten shooter.

Perpetrator 
The shooter was identified as 26-year old Ruslan Akhtyamov. He had reportedly been dealing with mental illness.

Victims 

Five people were killed in the attack:

 68-year-old man whom Akhtyamov stole the gun from; (died prior to the attack)
 35-year-old teacher of the Ryabinka kindergarten;
 5-year-old female kindergarten student;
 6-year-old male kindergarten student;
 Ruslan Akhtyamov (26 years old) - the assailant in the attack; committed suicide.

One person was injured, a 52-year-old assistant teacher.

Reactions 
The governor of the Ulyanovsk region, Aleksey Russkikh, said that the families of the victims would be provided with medical, psychological and social assistance. Ombudsman Tatyana Moskalkova called on the National Guard to be on duty in schools and kindergartens. Russkikh and Yuri Bezdudny, the governor of the Yamalo-Nenets Autonomous Okrug, provided their condolences for the tragedy.

See also 
 2014 Moscow school shooting
 List of mass shootings in Russia
 List of attacks related to primary schools
 Kerch Polytechnic College massacre
 Kazan school shooting
 Perm State University shooting
 Izhevsk school shooting

References 

2022 mass shootings in Europe
2022 murders in Russia
2022 suicides
April 2022 events in Russia
April 2022 crimes in Europe
Mass shootings in Russia
Murder–suicides in Europe
School killings in Russia
School shootings in Russia
Suicides by firearm in Russia
Ulyanovsk Oblast
Mass murder in 2022